Gianni Serra (14 December 1933 – 3 September 2020) was an Italian film director and screenwriter.

References

1930s births
2020 deaths
Mass media people from the Province of Brescia
Italian male screenwriters
20th-century Italian screenwriters
Film directors from Rome
Writers from Rome
20th-century Italian male writers